Willem (Wim) Kooiman (born 9 September 1960, in Oud-Beijerland) is a Dutch former footballer who played as central defender.

He still resides in Belgium, the country where he was active as professional footballer.

Honours

Player

Cercle Brugge 

 Belgian Cup: 1984-85

RSC Anderlecht 

 Belgian First Division: 1990–91, 1992-93, 1993-94
 Belgian Cup: 1993-94
 Belgian Super Cup: 1993
 European Cup Winners' Cup: 1989-90 (runners-up)

References 

Dutch footballers
Cercle Brugge K.S.V. players
R.S.C. Anderlecht players
1960 births
Living people
Association football central defenders